Gort Community School is a secondary school located in Gort in south County Galway. Founded in 1995, as of 2021, the school enrolled 879 pupils and the principal was Brian Crossan. Denis Corry was principal in 2010 when an extension called the Noone Building consisting of dressing rooms, a music room, a career guidance suite and an oratory was opened. In 2021, a further extension was confirmed by the Department of Education, and is projected to include new class rooms, special education rooms, science laboratories and general purpose and fitness areas.

References 

Secondary schools in County Galway